Vujadin Savić (born 1 July 1990) is a retired Serbian footballer.

Club career

Early career
Savić was eight years old when he began training for the Red Star Belgrade, where he passed all age categories. Between 2007 and 2009 he played for Rad before returning to Red Star where he would play in the first squad until 2010 when he moved to France and signed with Bordeaux. In January 2012, he went on loan to Dynamo Dresden for the rest of the 2011–12 season.

Watford
On 23 January 2015 Savić signed for English Championship club Watford until the end of the season. However, he was one of three released by Watford following their promotion to the Premier League in 2015, and left without making an appearance for the club.

Sheriff Tiraspol
In 2015, Savić joined Sheriff Tiraspol, where he made a total of 40 appearances and 4 goals in all competitions over two seasons. He scored a bicycle kick in a league match against Zaria Bălți on 19 September 2015.

Return to Red Star Belgrade
In June 2017, Savić returned to his home club, Red Star Belgrade, on a two-year contract. In his first season back in Belgrade, Red Star became the first team in history to make it to the 2018 Europa League knockout phase from the first qualifying round. It was also Red Star's first season surviving the group stage of a UEFA competition in 26 years. During the 2017 season, coach Vladan Milojević played Savić in reputable defensive partnerships with Srđan Babić and Damien Le Tallec. With Savić, Red Star conceded only two goals in the 2017 Europa League group stage; it was the second best defense in the Europa League group stage behind eventual semi-finalists Red Bull Salzburg. In May 2018, Savić was elected in the best 11 players for the 2017–18 Serbian SuperLiga season, by clubs captains' and managers' choice. The following season, Savić managed to guide Red Star to their first ever UEFA Champions League appearance. During the qualifying rounds, playing mostly in tandem with Miloš Degenek, Red Star managed to concede only three goals. In absence of club captain Nenad Milijaš, Savić captained Red Star in all four of the games he featured in. In two out of those four games, both home against Napoli and Liverpool, Red Star managed to keep a clean sheet. He played the first half against Liverpool at Anfield but was substituted at half-time due to injury. He missed the remaining two games against Napoli in Naples and Paris Saint-Germain in Belgrade also because of injury. On 25 January 2019, Savić extended his contract with Red Star until summer 2022.

APOEL
On 14 July 2019, Cypriot club APOEL officially announced Savić's signing. Savić joined APOEL from Red Star on a free transfer, with a provision that Red Star be paid half of the sum of his next transfer. He signed a three-year contract. In late August 2019, he underwent surgery for a groin injury.<ref name="MSS">{{cite web|url=https://www.meridian-sport.com/fudbal-vujadin-savic-povreda-apoel/|author=Nebojša Todorović|work=Meridian Sport|title=MORAO POD NOŽ Vujadin Savić operisan, brzo se vraća na teren|language=sr|date=29 August 2019|access-date=4 October 2019}}</ref>

On 15 February 2021, Savić was loaned to Slovenian PrvaLiga side Olimpija Ljubljana for the remainder of the 2020–21 Slovenian PrvaLiga season.

International career
Savić represented Serbia at the 2009 UEFA European Under-21 Football Championship. In March 2018, Savić got a first call to the Serbia national football team under coach Mladen Krstajić, for friendly games against Morocco and Nigeria. He failed to make a debut due to injury.

Personal life
Vujadin is a son of Serbian former professional footballer Dušan Savić. He has four children with unmarried spouse Mirka Vasiljević, who is an actress. Savić was named after Serbian coach and former player Vujadin Boškov. He is also nicknamed Giška'' after his relative Đorđe Božović.

Career statistics

Club

Honours

Club
Red Star Belgrade
 Serbian SuperLiga: 2017–18, 2018–19
 Serbian Cup: 2009–10

Sheriff
 National Division: 2015–16, 2016–17
 Moldovan Cup: 2016–17
 Moldovan Super Cup: 2016

APOEL
 Cyprus Super Cup: 2019

Olimpija Ljubljana
Slovenian Cup: 2020–21

Individual
 Serbian SuperLiga Team of the Season:  2017–18

References

External links

 
 
 

1990 births
Living people
Footballers from Belgrade
Serbian footballers
Association football defenders
Serbian expatriate footballers
Serbia youth international footballers
Serbia under-21 international footballers
Red Star Belgrade footballers
Red Star Belgrade non-playing staff
FK Rad players
FC Girondins de Bordeaux players
Dynamo Dresden players
Arminia Bielefeld players
Watford F.C. players
FC Sheriff Tiraspol players
APOEL FC players
NK Olimpija Ljubljana (2005) players
Serbian First League players
Serbian SuperLiga players
Ligue 1 players
Championnat National 2 players
2. Bundesliga players
Moldovan Super Liga players
Cypriot First Division players
Slovenian PrvaLiga players
Expatriate footballers in France
Expatriate footballers in Germany
Expatriate footballers in England
Expatriate footballers in Moldova
Expatriate footballers in Cyprus
Expatriate footballers in Slovenia
Serbian expatriate sportspeople in France
Serbian expatriate sportspeople in Germany
Serbian expatriate sportspeople in England
Serbian expatriate sportspeople in Moldova
Serbian expatriate sportspeople in Cyprus
Serbian expatriate sportspeople in Slovenia